Dumitreni may refer to:

 Dumitreni, a village in Alexeevca Commune, Floreşti district, Moldova
 Dumitreni, a village in Bălăușeri Commune, Mureș County, Romania

See also 
 Dumitru (name)
 Dumitrescu (surname)